Elizabeth Craig may refer to:

 Elizabeth Craig (writer) (1883–1980), Scottish journalist, home economist and cookery writer
 Elizabeth Craig (rower) (born 1957), Canadian rower
 Elizabeth Craig (politician) (born 1967/68), New Zealand politician and physician
 Elizabeth A. Craig, biochemist
 Lil Tudor-Craig (Elizabeth Tudor-Craig, born 1960), British conservationist, environmental artist, and literary illustrator
 Elizabeth Spann Craig, American novelist